Romanchuk is a surname common to Belarus and Ukraine. Other forms of the surname are Ramanchuk or Ramančuk, Romańczuk, Romančuk, Romanchik, and Romantschuk.

People

Romanchuk 
 Daniel Romanchuk (born 1998), American Paralympian athlete 
 Ivan Romanchuk (born 1990), Ukrainian footballer
 Jaroslav Romanchuk (born 1966), Belarusian economist and politician
 Mark Romanchuk (born 1962), American politician and businessman
 Maryna Bekh-Romanchuk (born 1995), Ukrainian long jumper
 Mykhailo Romanchuk (born 1996), Ukrainian swimmer
 Oleksandr Romanchuk (footballer, born 1984) (born 1984), Ukrainian footballer
 Oleksandr Romanchuk (footballer, born 1999), Ukrainian footballer
 Roman Romanchuk (boxer) (1979–2016), Ukrainian-Russian boxer
 Roman Romanchuk (footballer) (born 1986), Ukrainian footballer
 Ruslan Romanchuk (born 1974), Ukrainian footballer
 Serhiy Romanchuk (born 1982), Ukrainian strongman and powerlifter
 Vitaly Romanchuk (born 1950), Soviet-Belarusian water polo player

Romańczuk or Romanczuk 
 Bartosz Romańczuk (born 1983), Polish footballer
 Mark Romanczuk (born 1983), American baseball player
 Szymon (Romańczuk) (1936–2017), Polish Orthodox archbishop
 Taras Romanczuk (born 1991), Ukrainian-born Polish footballer

See also
 
 

Ukrainian-language surnames
Belarusian-language surnames